The Stork Pays Off is a 1941 American comedy film directed by Lew Landers and written by Fanya Foss and Aleen Leslie. The film stars Victor Jory, Rochelle Hudson, Maxie Rosenbloom, Horace McMahon, George McKay and Ralf Harolde. The film was released on October 6, 1941, by Columbia Pictures.

Plot
Gangster Deak Foster and his three henchmen, Brains Moran, Ears-to-the-Ground Hinkle and Photofinish Farris, take over what they think is a night club run by a rival, Stud Rocco, only to discover it is a nursery run by Irene Perry. All fall under the benign influence to the point where the three henchmen go to night school to be educated and Deak falls in love with Julie.

Cast          
Victor Jory as Deak Foster
Rochelle Hudson as Irene Perry
Maxie Rosenbloom as 'Brains' Moran 
Horace McMahon as 'Ears-to-the-Ground' Hinkle
George McKay as 'Photofinish' Farris
Ralf Harolde as 'Stud' Rocco
Danny Mummert as Herkemer
Bonnie Irma Dane as Bonnie
Arthur Loft as Barney

References

External links
 

1941 films
1941 comedy films
American black-and-white films
American comedy films
Columbia Pictures films
Films directed by Lew Landers
1940s English-language films
1940s American films